The Philadelphia Freedom was a soccer club that competed in the USISL and the USISL Pro League. The team was known as the Pennsylvania Freedom through the 1995/96 indoor season before changing its name prior to the 1996 outdoor season.  The team folded at the end of the 1997 season.

Year-by-year

External links
USISL history page

F
Defunct soccer clubs in Pennsylvania
Defunct sports teams in Philadelphia
USL Second Division teams
1997 disestablishments in Pennsylvania
1994 establishments in Pennsylvania
Association football clubs disestablished in 1997
Association football clubs established in 1994
Defunct indoor soccer clubs in the United States